The Imataka Mountains are located in the north-west of Guyana and north-east of Venezuela.

The area is extremely rich in forest, water and mineral resources. Huge deposits of iron ore are known. Manganese deposits are found in north-west Guyana, while gold and diamonds, among other minerals, are found in the Barima, Mazaruni, Cuyuni and Potaro areas.

The Imataka mountains separate the Barama River system from the Cuyuni. The mountains are also the source of the Barama river.

References 

Mountain ranges of Guyana
Mountain ranges of Venezuela